Pakistan Link is a Pakistani weekly newspaper based in Anaheim, California, United States. The newspaper also has a version published in Urdu, called the Urdu Link. The newspaper Pakistan Link is distributed throughout the United States and is also sold through ethnic grocery stores in the US and Canada.

News coverage of events in Pakistan
A prominent Pakistani politician Benazir Bhutto was assassinated on 27 December 2007 in Pakistan and this news was also covered by a California newspaper, Long Beach Press Telegram where its reporter interviewed many local people from among the 40,000 strong Pakistani American local community including a regular newspaper columnist from Pakistan Link newspaper, Nayyer Ali. Long Beach Press Telegram then used Nayyer Ali's quotes to write up their news article.

Staff and columnists
 Arif Zaffar Mansuri - President and Managing Editor
 Akhtar Mahmud Faruqui - Editor
 Nayyer Ali - Columnist
 Dr. S. A. Hussain - Columnist
 Abdus Sattar Ghazali - Reporter at Large
 Dr. Ghulam M. Haniff - Columnist
 S. Arif Hussaini - Columnist
 Mowahid Shah - Columnist
 Dr. Mahjabeen Islam - Columnist

References

External links
Official Website
Business News

1994 establishments in California
Weekly newspapers published in California
Publications established in 1994
Pakistani news websites
Pakistani-American mass media
Bilingual newspapers
Urdu-language newspapers published in the United States
Pakistani-American culture in California